Gridiron Secret Society, founded in 1908, is a secret society at the University of Georgia. Gridiron has been called "the highest honor a male student may receive on the University of Georgia campus.". It has also been recognized as one of the "Top 10 Secret Member's Clubs" in the world.

Gridiron is believed to draw most of its membership from students, faculty, and alumni of the university. Although, a number of members have no known association with it. Student members are drawn from various disciplines university-wide including the law school, Ag Hill, the Greek system and UGA athletics. Honorary members are usually prominent leaders in government, law, medicine, or business, mostly from and associated with the State of Georgia. The organization has extensive alumni participation, with well-attended banquets held in Athens twice each year, but its purposes and activities remain a closely guarded secret.

The organization is thought to have connections with certain structures and historic sites around the State of Georgia and the rest of the Southern United States (Warm Springs, Georgia Guidestones, Georgia Capitol building), but its members do not publish any information. The organization is believed to be associated with other secret organizations, which operate around the world under different names including Yale University's Skull and Bones. Observers have noted that University of Georgia's first president Abraham Baldwin was a Yale graduate and likely a member of Skull and Bones.

Membership
The society's name is believed to be in reference to the playing field on which football is played, however "qualifications for membership and activities are known only to members."

Known members include every governor and United States senator from Georgia since the 1930s, including Jimmy Carter, Richard B. Russell Jr., Herman Talmadge, Zell Miller, Ellis Arnall, Ernest Vandiver, Carl Sanders, Joe Frank Harris, George Busbee, Roy Barnes, Sonny Perdue, Sam Nunn, Mack Mattingly, Max Cleland, Johnny Isakson, Saxby Chambliss, and Brian Kemp, as well numerous other political, civic and business leaders. Current members serving under the Gold Dome include House Speaker David Ralston, Senate President Pro Tempore Butch Miller, and Chairman of the Georgia Democratic Party Dubose Porter, and former Atlanta Mayor Kasim Reed.

University of Georgia head football coach, Kirby Smart, is a member as was former football coach Vince Dooley. Other noteworthy members include Atlanta Olympics organizer Billy Payne, former U.S. Ambassador David I. Adelman, Olympic Swim Coach Jack Bauerle, athletic booster Sonny Seiler, Charles S. Sanford Jr., humorist Lewis Grizzard, sportscaster Skip Caray, film and television producer Patrick N. Millsaps, professional golfers Hudson Swafford, Keith Mitchell, and Kevin Kisner, and football greats Stetson Bennett, Herschel Walker, two-time Super Bowl champion David Andrews, David Greene, Jon Stinchcomb, Matt Stinchcomb, Aaron Murray, and Fran Tarkenton.

Other identified members include Atlanta Mayor William B. Hartsfield, Dean Rusk, U.S. Representative Jack Kingston, John Barrow, Griffin Bell, Pat Swindall, Richard Russell Jr., Lewis Massey, Pete Theodocion, Thurbert Baker, Bernard Ramsey, Harold G. Clarke, Frank Sinkwich, Dan Amos, H. E. Nichols.

References

University of Georgia
1908 establishments in Georgia (U.S. state)